Yam (Örtöö, checkpoint) was a postal system or supply point route messenger system  extensively used and expanded by Ögedei Khan and also used by subsequent Great Khans and Khans.

The system was used to speed up the process of information and intelligence.

The system was preserved in Tsarist Russia after the disintegration of the Golden Horde.

Etymology 
The name Yam was adopted into most Western languages from Russian, in which it probably is from Mongolian yam ('ministry' or 'office'). However, in the Mongolian Empire, both the postal system and the individual stations were named Örtöö (Örtege in Classical Mongolian).

Description
A messenger would arrive at a station and give his information to another messenger, and meanwhile rest and let the other messenger go on to the next station to hand the document to yet another messenger. This way information or documents were constantly on the move without each messenger getting tired. In each relay station, there would be spare horses, food, and shelter.

As one of the most fundamental tools for managing the Mongol Empire, the operation of the Yam system was regulated by the written law Yassa. Both messengers and station operators enjoyed extended privileges. Even for everybody else, the requirements of the Yam took precedence before their other duties and interests, and they had to support it whenever it became necessary. This kind of support was made possible by the strict discipline within the empire, which also led to a high level of security, often described as Pax Mongolica.

At first, the system was also available to merchants free of cost. The abuse of this possibility led Möngke Khan to require that commercial users pay for the services.

The service has been described in great detail by European travellers including Giovanni da Pian del Carpine, William of Rubruck, Marco Polo, and Odoric of Pordenone. While it was not the first messenger system in history (earlier ones existed in the Persian and Roman Empires), it was unprecedented in size and efficiency.

Each rider had a paiza, which was an engraved metal pendant, usually circular or rectangular. It symbolized that they were messengers of the Khan.

Tsarist Russia

It was implemented in the form of  levied onto both urban and rural populations. It was controlled by a yamskoy prikaz. Certain villages existing along the old roads retain the word yam in their names, such as Yam-Tyosovo. Gavrilov-Yam, a city in Russia is also named after the yam post station network.

See also
 Inca road system
 Pony Express
 Royal Road
 Stage station

References

Bibliography
 

Mongol Empire
Postal history
Postal history of Russia